Antidawn is an EP by British electronic musician Burial, released 6 January 2022 via Hyperdub.

Composition
Antidawn is a collection of beatless ambient music, cementing the direction that Burial had taken since his late 2010s work, and was his most ambient work yet. The tracks have unconventional structures and focus on distorted vocal samples and crackles, combining into a "loose, amorphous soundscape". Tom Kingsley of Clash Music wrote that Burial's only previous track "that comes close" to Antidawn was the 2021 B-side "Dolphinz". Resident Advisor reviewer Emeka Okonkwo described it as a release of "spectral, wintery ambient sound-collages" and compared it to previous Burial tracks "Rival Dealer" and "Beachfires". For Loud and Quiet critic Luke Cartledge, the EP is a "familiar blend of rainy, minor-key textures and forlorn-sounding field recordings". "New Love" is the only track to contain percussive elements, although they are vague and distant.

Kingsley compared the music to the KLF's Chill Out (1990) due to their use of collage "as a way to convey a sense of movement, not only through space ("all the way down the East Coast") but through time" and for their use of musique concrète, "piecing together functional, everyday sounds – the strike of a lighter, coughs and muffled voices, metallic clangs – to create something totally otherworldly."

Reception

Year-end lists

Track listing

References 

2022 EPs
Burial (musician) EPs
Hyperdub EPs
Ambient albums by English artists
Ambient EPs
Sound collage albums
Field recording